This was the first edition of the tournament.

James Duckworth won the title after defeating Sam Barry 7–6(7–5), 6–4 in the final.

Seeds

Draw

Finals

Top half

Bottom half

References 
 Main Draw
 Qualifying Draw

Singles
KPN Renewables Bangkok Open - Singles
 in Thai tennis